Dong-gun, also spelled Dong-geon, is a Korean masculine given name. The meaning differs based on the hanja used to write each syllable of the name. There are 24 hanja with the reading "dong" and 15 hanja with the reading "gun" on the South Korean government's official list of hanja which may be registered for use in given names.

People with this name include:
Jang Dong-gun (born 1972), South Korean actor
Lee Dong-gun (born 1980), South Korean actor 
Cho Dong-geon (born 1986), South Korean football forward
No Dong-geon (born 1991), South Korean football goalkeeper

See also
List of Korean given names

References

Korean masculine given names